The Churchill Theatre in Bromley, southeast London was built by the London Borough of Bromley to designs by its borough architect's department. The Churchill is an example of a repertory theatre built in the style of European opera houses, with a large stage and sub-stage workshops. Integrated into the central library complex overlooking Church House Gardens and Library Gardens, it was built on the side of a hill, disguising the number and size of the lower levels and giving the impression of being smaller by setting the auditorium below ground level which is entered by descending staircases from the foyer.

The theatre, named after former Prime Minister Winston Churchill, was opened on 19 July 1977 by the Prince of Wales, and seats 781.  It took seven years to build at a cost of £1.63m.

It is now run on a contract currently held by "Trafalgar entertainment", previous to that HQ Theatres & Hospitality and previous to that Ambassador Theatre Group.

References

Theatres in the London Borough of Bromley
Performance art venues
Producing house theatres in London